Nazar is a masculine name with multiple origins.

Christian use
As used by Christians, it means "from Nazareth," the town where Jesus Christ was said to have lived. The etymology of Nazareth from as early as Eusebius up until the 20th century has been said to derive from the Hebrew word נצר netser, meaning a "shoot" or "sprout", while the apocryphal Gospel of Phillip derives the name from Nazara meaning "truth".

Nazario is an Italian and Spanish version of the name, Nazaire is a French version and Nazarii is a Ukrainian and Nazaryi Russian form. Other variants in use include Naz, Nasareo, Nasarrio, Nazaret, Nazarie, Nazaro, Nazarene, Nazerine and Nazor. Nazret, the Amharic word for Nazareth, is also occasionally used as a female name in Ethiopia and Eritrea, while Nazaret is also occasionally used as a name for girls in Spanish-speaking areas. According to the web site behindthename.com, all are derived from the name Nazarius, which was in use in late Roman times and was also the name of some early Christian saints and martyrs. In 2008, Nazar was the most popular name for boys born in Ukraine.

People
Saint Nazarius (Roman Martyrology), saint of the Roman Catholic Church, mentioned in the Martyrology of Bede and earlier editions of the Roman Martyrology
Saint Nazarius (Abbot), fourteenth abbot of the monastery of Lérins
Saints Nazarius and Celsus, two martyrs of whom nothing is known except the discovery of their bodies by Saint Ambrose
Nazar Al Baharna (born 1950), Bahraini academic, entrepreneur and politician
Nazar Baýramow (born 1982), Turkmenistani footballer 
Nazar Mahmud (born 1988), Israeli-Druze figure skater
Nazar Mohammad (1921–1996), Pakistani cricketer 
Nazar Mohamed Kassim, Singaporean convicted killer 
Nazaret Daghavarian (1862-1915), born Chaderjian, Armenian doctor, agronomist and public activist, and one of the founders of the Armenian General Benevolent Union
Nazario Escoto, acting President of "Democratic" Nicaragua after the death of Francisco Castellón during Granada-León civil war
Nazario Sauro (1880–1916), Austrian-born Italian irredentist and sailor
Nazario Toledo (1807-1887), Costa Rican politician
John Paul Nazarius, Dominican theologian
Nazariy Yaremchuk (1951–1995), Ukrainian singer
Ruzi Nazar (CIA agent who was supposed to have Uzbek origin)
Nursultan Nazarbayev (First president of Republic of Kazakhstan)

See also
Nazarov

References

https://www.almaany.com/ar/name/%D9%86%D8%B2%D8%A7%D8%B1/
https://www.maajim.com/dictionary/%D9%86%D8%B2%D8%A7%D8%B1

Masculine given names